House at No. 13 Grove Street is a historic home located at Mount Morris in Livingston County, New York. It is a two-story, five bay wide and two bay deep brick building dominated by a projecting front pavilion and a profusion of Eastlake inspired ornamentation.  It is believed to have been built in the 1860s / 1870s.  The front facade is spanned by a hipped roof verandah.

It was listed on the National Register of Historic Places in 1999.

References

Houses on the National Register of Historic Places in New York (state)
Queen Anne architecture in New York (state)
Houses in Livingston County, New York
National Register of Historic Places in Livingston County, New York